The Faculty of Arts and Humanities (popularly known as UCL Faculty of Arts & Humanities) is one of the 11 constituent faculties of University College London (UCL). The current Executive Dean is Professor Stella Bruzzi, FBA. Ranked 5th in the Times Higher Education World University Rankings (2022), the Faculty of Arts & Humanities at UCL is recognised globally for both its teaching and research excellence.

History
In October 2013 it was announced that the Translation Studies Unit of Imperial College London would move to UCL, becoming part of the UCL School of European Languages, Culture & Society.

Departments
The Faculty currently comprises the following departments:
UCL Department of Arts and Sciences
UCL Department of English Language and Literature
UCL Department of European and International Social and Political Sciences
UCL Department of Greek & Latin (Classics)
UCL Department of Hebrew and Jewish Studies
UCL Department of Information Studies
UCL Department of Philosophy
School of European Languages, Culture & Society (SELCS)
UCL Slade School of Fine Art
Institute of Advanced Studies

SELCS offers the widest range of language-based degrees in the UK, with programmes in Dutch, French, German, Italian, Scandinavian, Iberian and Latin American Studies as well as cutting-edge interdisciplinary programmes in Comparative Literature, Early Modern, European, Film, Health, Gender, Race and Translation Studies.

Research

The impacts of UCL Arts & Humanities research on the wider world have been recognised in the Research Excellence Framework 2021 (REF2021). The Faculty of Arts and Humanities, was ranked 6th in the UK in terms of Research Power in the REF2021.

Rankings
In the 2013 QS World University Rankings, UCL was ranked 8th in the world (and 3rd in Europe) for Arts and Humanities. In the 2014 QS World University Rankings by Subject, UCL was ranked 15th in the world (and 4th in Europe) for English Language and Literature, 8th in the world (and 3rd in Europe) for Modern Languages and joint 51st-100th in the world (and joint 16th in Europe) for Philosophy. In the 2016/2017 QS World University Rankings, UCL is currently ranked 7th in the world. It also holds its highest historical ranking for Arts and Humanities at 4th in the world, according to the Times Higher Education World University Rankings.

See also
UCL Centre for Digital Humanities
UCL Institute of Jewish Studies
Slade Centre for Electronic Media in Fine Art

References

External links
UCL Faculty of Arts and Humanities
University College London

Departments of University College London